Jimmy Reyes Bautista (born 10 June 1983) is a Dominican footballer who plays as a midfielder for Universidad O&M F.C. in the Liga Dominicana de Fútbol.

Career statistics

International

References

External links

Jimmy Reyes on LDF

1983 births
Living people
Dominican Republic footballers
Dominican Republic international footballers
Association football midfielders
San Cristóbal FC players
Atlético Pantoja players
Universidad O&M FC players
Atlético Vega Real players
Club Barcelona Atlético players
Liga Dominicana de Fútbol players
People from San Cristóbal, Dominican Republic
CA San Cristóbal players